The National Anthem of the Mali Federation was created by the Federation's Official Law in 18/06/1960. It has the music of the current National Anthem of Mali composed by Banzumana Sissoko (with an old intro and other notes) and lyrics of the current National Anthem of Senegal written by Léopold Sédar Senghor (slightly modified). After separation of the two countries, Mali kept the music (because the composer was from this country) and Senegal retained the lyrics of the Federation (which was written by who would be the first Senegalese President)  but removing the name "Mali" and others minor changes.

Lyrics

References 

National anthems
Historical national anthems
Malian music
Senegalese music